Brian G. Dyson (born September, 1935) was the chief executive officer (CEO) of Coca-Cola Enterprises Inc. from 1986 to 1991.

Brian is also known for his “five balls” speech.

Career

He joined Coca-Cola Co. in Venezuela in 1959 and worked for many years in South America, the Caribbean and Mexico. In 1978 Dyson was named the President of Coca-Cola United States, the Company's U.S. soft drink division. In 1983, he was named president of Coca-Cola North America, with responsibility for the Company's entire North America portfolio. In 1986 Dyson was named president and Chief Executive Officer (CEO) of Coca-Cola Enterprises (CCE).

He served as a Senior Consultant to The Coca-Cola Company from January 1992 to October 1993. He retired from The Coca-Cola Company in 1994, but remained active as a consultant to the Company. In August 2001 he came out of retirement and accepted the position of Vice Chairman and Chief Operating Officer (COO) of The Coca-Cola Company.

Dyson was the one who at first changed old Coke's name and then restored it.

He is a Member of Advisory Board of Linley Capital. Since May 1995, Dyson served as a Director of Audits & Surveys Worldwide Inc. He served as the Chairman of the Board of PlusPharma since August 2004. Brian G. Dyson has been the President of Chatham International Corp. since December 1993.

He earned his BA from Facultad de Ciencias Económicas in University of Buenos Aires. He later attended Harvard Business School. An author of short stories, in 1996 he published a novel, Pepper in the Blood.

Personal life
Brian Dyson is married to Penny Dyson. In 1978, the family moved to Atlanta. Brian and Penny Dyson have two children.

References 

American chief executives of food industry companies
Living people
American drink industry businesspeople
Harvard Business School alumni
Chief operating officers
University of Buenos Aires alumni
1935 births
Coca-Cola people